Jose J. Roy (July 19, 1904 – March 14, 1986) was a Filipino lawyer, economist, and politician who served for 25 consecutive years as a congressman and senator in the Congress of the Philippines. Known as the "poor man's economist", he drafted, authored and sponsored laws to improve the lot of the peasantry. As a member of Congress, he took particular pride in the sponsorship of almost all laws on land reform. He is also considered to be the "Father of the Philippine Banking System" because of his authorship and involvement in almost all the major finance and tariff measures since the beginning of the Third Philippine Republic in 1946.

Early life
Roy was born and raised in Moncada, Tarlac. His family were tenant farmers and he attended public schools. As a young boy, his first ambition was to become a writer and one of the topics he wrote on for a school paper was crop-sharing. Seeing and much affected by the oppression surrounding the farmers around him, he thought crop-sharing would be the best remedy for the life of disparity that existed between the wealthy landlords and the poverty-stricken tenant farmers.

Roy worked his way through college and graduated from the University of the Philippines with an Bachelor of Laws degree in 1930. With his knowledge of Spanish, English, Filipino, Ilocano and Pampango, he was able to support himself through law school by working as an interpreter in the Public Service Commission. After graduation, he continued working at the PSC where he later became a special attorney specializing in transportation. At that time, he was just one of three public utility practitioners who specialized in transportation.

In 1936, the mining boom came and Roy expanded his practice to become a corporate lawyer. He organized mining corporations. His career flourished until the Second World War broke out.

Political career
After the war in 1946, the first elections were held. The presidential candidate of the Liberal party was Manuel A. Roxas. Roxas persuaded Roy to run for Congress. Roy agreed only after being promised that if they won, Roxas would consider supporting the 70-30 Rice Share Tenancy law he was planning to author. This law would provide that 70% of the rice crop be given to the tenant farmers and 30% to the landowners in all rice-producing regions of the Philippines and, after studying the matter, Roxas found that it had its merits. The 1946 election was a very difficult one. Roy was elected to congress as representative of the 1st district of Tarlac. He was the lone Liberal Party candidate to win in Central Luzon.

Over the next 16 years, Roy was elected to four consecutive terms as congressman of Tarlac's 1st District. He was instrumental in the drafting and passage of important finance and socio-economic measures which he authored or co-authored. Among them were the Central Bank Act, Rehabilitation Finance Corporation Act (R.A.85), Development Bank Act, the General Banking Act, the Rural Bank Act, Philippine Veterans Bank Act (R.A. 3518), the Philippines Deposit Insurance Corporation Act (R.A.3591); the Industrialization Act (R.A.901); Ramie Incentive Act, Agricultural Tenancy Act, 70-30 Rice Share Tenancy Act, Land Tenure Act, the Land Reform Code, the original Anti-Graft Law, the Congressional 5-Year Development Plan, Tax Exemption to Basic Industries, Laurel-Langley Agreement, the Tariff and Customs Code of 1957, an Act providing the creation, organization and operation of an internal audit service for all departments, bureaus and offices of the national government. He was a member of the Philippine Council of Leaders, the Development Council, the Council of State and Security Council.

In the general election of 1961, Roy was elected as senator for the Fifth Congress. He was one of only two Nacionalista Party senatorial candidates who was elected. In the November 14, 1967 Senate election, Roy garnered the highest number of votes in his re-election bid for senator receiving over 51 percent of the votes and more than half a million votes over his nearest pursuer. He was the lone incumbent to defend his seat. The Nacionalista Party won seven of the eight possible senate seats. As senator, Roy was elected as the Majority Floor Leader and later that year President Pro-tempore of the Sixth Congress in 1966 and President Pro-tempore of the Seventh Congress and a member of the Commission on Appointments. As President Pro-tempore, Roy urged then President Ferdinand Marcos to reduce the power of various political warlords throughout the country by forcing them to disband their private armies and His efforts failed, however, and the Seventh Congress was eventually abolished when Marcos declared martial law in 1972.

Other
Roy had the distinction of being the only legislator in both houses to serve continuously for 25 years. He never lost an election. Roy was the only member of Congress who was chosen as one of the Ten Best Congressmen each year from 1948 to 1961 by civic organizations, members of the press and national periodicals. An experienced speaker and debater who had a knack for explaining the intricacies of economics, banking and finance in terms understandable to the masses, he was quite popular with the Filipino people. In his time, Roy was a frequent delegate to international conferences.  He represented the country as a delegate to the United Nations in 1950, 1952, 1968 and 1969. In 1952, he was a delegate to the International Monetary Fund and World Bank Conference in Mexico City, and in Washington DC in 1954 and 1956. He was also delegate of the Philippine Economic Mission for the revision of the Phil-US Trade Act in Washington DC in 1954. In 1958, by invitation of Her Majesty's Government, Roy was an official guest of the British Government for a goodwill tour of the United Kingdom. In 1960 Roy made an economic survey of Scandinavian countries and of Western Europe. In 1962 he was a member of the Philippine delegate to the Inter-Parliamentary Congress Conference in Brazilia, Brazil. Member of the Joint Phil-US Veterans Commission to Washington DC. Roy headed the 1969 Philippine delegation to the Inaugural Conference of the Asian Coconut Community in Ceylon and delegate to the 1970 Pacific Asia Conference of Ministers in Jakarta and the SEATO Ministers conference in Manila.

Roy was a lifetime member of the Philippine Historical Society, Knight Commander of the Knights of Rizal, president of the Philippine Philatelic Association as well as a lifetime member of several veterans' organizations. He was the chairman of the 5th General Conference of the World Anti-Communist League and a member of the Asian People Anti-Communist League. Roy also served as chairman of the board of trustees of the Angeles University Foundation, a university in Angeles, Pampanga.

Outside of public service, Roy remained a stalwart of the Philippine Bar. He was one of the moving spirits of the Integrated Bar of the Philippines and was elected president of the Philippine Lawyers Association in 1968 while managing Jose J. Roy and Associates Law Offices.

Personal life
Jose de Jesus Roy Sr. was married to Consolacion Ruiz Domingo (Dec. 26, 1910-Aug. 5, 1992) and had three children, Jose Domingo Roy Jr., Vilma Domingo Roy-Duavit and Ronald Domingo Roy.

Death
Jose Roy died on March 14, 1986.

References

1904 births
1986 deaths
Members of the House of Representatives of the Philippines from Tarlac
Presidents pro tempore of the Senate of the Philippines
Majority leaders of the Senate of the Philippines
Senators of the 7th Congress of the Philippines
Senators of the 6th Congress of the Philippines
Senators of the 5th Congress of the Philippines
Liberal Party (Philippines) politicians
Nacionalista Party politicians
Presidents of the Nacionalista Party
20th-century Filipino lawyers
20th-century Filipino economists
University of the Philippines alumni
People from Tarlac